The pair skating event held as part of the figure skating at the 1920 Summer Olympics. It was the second appearance of the pair skating event and the sport, which had previously been held in 1908. Eight pairs from six nations competed. Bronze medalist Phyllis Johnson had captured the silver medal at the 1908 Olympics with a different partner.

Results

Referee:
  Victor Lundquist

Judges:
  Louis Magnus
  Knut Ørn Meinich
  Eudore Lamborelle
  Herbert Yglesias
  Alfred Mégroz
  August Anderberg
  Sakari Ilmanen

References

Sources
 
 

Figure skating at the 1920 Summer Olympics
1920 in figure skating
1920
Mixed events at the 1920 Summer Olympics